Frederick George Spackman (16 September 1878 – 30 May 1942) was a British footballer who played as an inside-right. He competed in the 1900 Olympic Games in Paris, winning a gold medal as a member of Upton Park club team.

Spackman played for Queens Park Rangers and Wandsworth before joining Fulham during the 1899–1900 season, along with his brother Harry. He was part of the team that won the Southern League Second Division in 1902–03. He made a total of 53 league appearances for the club.

Spackman worked as a proofreader for The Times.

References

External links

1878 births
1942 deaths
Sportspeople from Maidstone
Footballers from Kent
English footballers
Association football inside forwards
Olympic gold medallists for Great Britain
Olympic footballers of Great Britain
Olympic medalists in football
Footballers at the 1900 Summer Olympics
Medalists at the 1900 Summer Olympics
Queens Park Rangers F.C. players
Fulham F.C. players
Upton Park F.C. players
The Times people